Gunsta is a locality situated in Uppsala Municipality, Uppsala County, Sweden with 380 inhabitants in 2010.

References 

Populated places in Uppsala County
Populated places in Uppsala Municipality